Jessica Pierce (born October 21, 1965) is an American bioethicist, philosopher, and writer. She currently has a loose affiliation with the Center for Bioethics and Humanities, University of Colorado Denver, but is mostly independent, focussing on writing. Early in her career, her research primarily addressed ethical questions about healthcare and the environment. Since the 2000s, however, much of her work has focused on animal ethics. She has published eleven books, including multiple collaborations with the ecologist Marc Bekoff.

Career
Pierce completed her Bachelor of Arts at Scripps College, before studying for a Master of Divinity at Divinity School of Harvard University. She then received a PhD in religious studies (specialising in religious ethics) at the University of Virginia. In the late 1980s, Pierce became a "major advocate" of environmental sustainability in healthcare, epitomising (in the words of the philosopher Cristina Richie) a "'second generation' of environmental bioethicists", after a first generation epitomised by Van Rensselaer Potter.

In 1993, Pierce briefly worked as an assistant professor in the Randolph-Macon Women's College Department of Religion. From 1993 to 2000, she was an assistant professor at the University of Nebraska Medical Center in the Humanities and Law section of the Department of Preventive and Societal Medicine. Her first book, Environmentalism and the New Logic of Business, co-written with R. Edward Freeman and Richard H. Dodd, was published in 2000.

Pierce was a visiting fellow at the University of Pittsburgh Center for Bioethics and Health Law from 1999 to 2000, and then, from 2001 to 2006, she lectured at the University of Colorado Boulder, working in departments focused respectively on philosophy, religious studies and environmental studies. The Ethics of Environmentally Responsible Health Care, which Pierce cowrote with Andrew Jameton, was published in 2004, and Pierce's case book Morality Play followed in 2005.

After leaving Boulder in 2006, Pierce became affiliated with the Center for Bioethics and Humanities at the University of Colorado Denver (later the Anschutz Medical Campus). However, this connection is a loose one; she no longer teaches, and considers herself an "independent entity", focusing on writing instead of the administration and bureaucracy of university work. She published Contemporary Bioethics, a reader co-edited with George Randals, in 2009. Having previously focused her research on human health, including her early research interests in the connections between health and the environment, Pierce began to focus her research on animals in the 2000s. She co-authored Wild Justice with the ecologist and ethologist Marc Bekoff in 2010, and two sole-authored books followed: The Last Walk in 2012 and Run, Spot, Run in 2016. She subsequently collaborated with Bekoff on 2007's The Animals' Agenda, which was published the same year as Pierce's second collection, Hospice and Palliative Care for Companion Animals, co-edited with Amir Shanan and Tamara Shearer. Again writing with Bekoff, she published Unleashing Your Dog in 2019 and A Dog's World in 2021.

Philosophy
In Environmentalism and the New Logic of Business, Freeman, Dodd, and Pierce argue that businesses should lead on environmental issues rather than merely meeting state-mandated standards. In The Ethics of Environmentally Responsible Health Care, Pierce and Jameton explore the environmental impact of the health sector.

Bekoff and Pierce argue in Wild Justice that animals display evidence of consciousness, cooperation, empathy, justice, and morality. 
In The Animals' Agenda, Pierce's second book with Bekoff, the authors argue that the science of animal welfare should be replaced by a science of animal well-being. In Unleashing Your Dog they argue that people who live with dogs need to become adept at seeing the world from dogs' point of view to give their dogs a good life. In A Dog's World, the authors challenge assumptions about dogs by offering an extended thought experiment of a world in which dogs live without humans.

The Last Walk explores the ethics of companion animal death. Run, Spot, Run explores the ethical ambiguity of pet ownership in general.

Selected bibliography

Pierce has authored or co-authored over 50 articles in peer reviewed journals and chapters in scholarly edited collections.

Freeman, R. Edward, Jessica Pierce and Richard H. Dodd (2000). Environmentalism and the New Logic of Business: How Firms Can be Profitable and Leave Our Children a Living Planet. Oxford: Oxford University Press.
Pierce, Jessica, and Andrew Jameton (2004). The Ethics of Environmentally Responsible Health Care. Oxford: Oxford University Press.
Pierce, Jessica (2005). Morality Play: Case Studies in Ethics. New York: McGraw-Hill.
Second edition published by Waveland Press in 2013.
Pierce, Jessica and George Randels, eds. (2009). Contemporary Bioethics: A Reader with Cases. Oxford: Oxford University Press.
Bekoff, Marc, and Jessica Pierce (2010). Wild Justice: The Moral Lives of Animals. Chicago: University of Chicago Press.
Pierce, Jessica (2012). The Last Walk: Reflections on Our Pets at the End of Their Lives. Chicago: University of Chicago Press.
Pierce, Jessica (2016). Run, Spot, Run: The Ethics of Keeping Pets. Chicago: University of Chicago Press.
Bekoff, Marc, and Jessica Pierce (2017). The Animals' Agenda: Freedom, Compassion, and Coexistence in the Human Age. Boston: Beacon Press.
Shanan, Amir, Tamara Shearer, and Jessica Pierce, eds. (2017). Hospice and Palliative Care for Companion Animals: Principles and Practice. Hoboken: Wiley.
Bekoff, Marc, and Jessica Pierce (2019). Unleashing Your Dog: A Field Guide to Giving Your Canine Companion the Best Life Possible. Novato, California: New World Library.
Pierce, Jessica, and Marc Bekoff (2021). A Dog's World: Imagining the Lives of Dogs in a World without Humans. Princeton: Princeton University Press.

References

External links
Official site
All Dogs Go to Heaven, Pierce's blog with Psychology Today

1965 births
Living people
American animal welfare scholars
American philosophers
American women philosophers
Animal ethicists
Bioethicists
Harvard Divinity School alumni
Scripps College alumni
University of Virginia alumni
Randolph College faculty
University of Nebraska Medical Center faculty
University of Colorado Boulder faculty
University of Colorado Denver faculty